Rewmi ( in Wolof") is a political party in Senegal. It is led by Idrissa Seck, after he founded it in 2006.

History 
The party boycotted the June 2007 parliamentary election. Idrissa Seck run in the 2012 presidential election but finished fifth and decided to endorse Macky Sall for the second round. Following that, the party joined Macky Sall's United in Hope coalition for the 2012 election, that resulted in the coalition winning a majority of the seats. However just a year later the national secretariat of the party unanimously decided to quit the alliance over several disagreements between Idrissa Seck and Macky Sall.

in 2019 Idrissa Seck contested for the third time the presidential election as main opponent of Macky Sall, and finished second with 20.51% of the votes, its best performance up to that moment. Following the outbreak of the COVID-19 pandemic, with Senegal registering its first case on 2 March 2020, Idrisa Seck started talks with  other opposition forces and Macky Sall in order to find a common plan to face the pandemic. This culminated with Idrissa Seck being nominated president of the Economic, Social and Environmental Council on 1 November 2020 and Rewmi  officially joining the government with two of his members being assigned ministerial positions, putting an end to the conflict between Idrissa Seck and Macky Sall.

Rewmi contested both the 2022 local elections and the 2022 national election back as member of the United in Hope coalition, but registered defeats in its historic stronghold of Thiés leaving Idrissa Seck in a weakened position and possibly close to withdrawing from political life.

Electoral results

Presidential elections

National Assembly elections

References 

Political parties established in 2006
2006 establishments in Senegal
Liberal parties in Senegal